The Old Newton Burial Ground is a historic cemetery located in Newton, Sussex County, New Jersey. The cemetery was the primary burial ground in the town for a century after its establishment in 1762. As the burial ground would reach capacity, the state legislature incorporated the Newton Cemetery Company which began operating a new cemetery in 1867. After this time, interments would continue at the old burial ground intermittently until 1943.  The burial ground contains the graves of members of local families from Newton and the surrounding areas, and includes several local and state political figures, prominent citizens, and veterans. While nineteenth-century sources attest 5,000 burials within the cemetery, a recent transcription lists only 1,287 individual known graves.

Old Newton Burial Ground is not in operation. The 1.66-acre (0.67 ha) property is owned by the Newton Cemetery Company. It is maintained in cooperation with the Sussex County Historical Society and Sussex County Sheriff's Office. The Old Newton Burial Ground was included as a contributing property within the Newton Town Plot Historic District, and listed on the National Register of Historic Places in 1992.

History
The Old Newton Burial Ground was established as a part of Jonathan Hamptons Town Plot (1762) which formed the historic core of the Town of Newton including properties around the county's courthouse (built 1762–65) and town green. The burial ground was expanded twice. In 1820, Daniel Stuart (died 1822) deeded a 0.4-acre (0.16 ha) parcel along the graveyard's northeast. In that year, the entire graveyard was enclosed by a stone wall (previously it was bound by "wooden coping"). Approximately  of this wall was removed in 1966 and replaced with chain-link fence. The cemetery's entrance is through a gate on the Main Street featuring double-leaf cast-iron entry gates. The gates were decorated with "medallions, bearing a bas-relief of Father Time with scythe and hourglass" of which one of the two survive.

The burial ground contains the graves of the members of several families who were involved in the eighteenth- and nineteenth-century settlement and growth of Newton and the surrounding areas. Among them are individuals who were local and state political figures, as well as local business leaders and prominent citizens. The burial ground contains the graves of veterans of the French and Indian War, American Revolution, Barbary War, War of 1812, American Civil War, and other conflicts. The number of persons buried in the Old Newton Burial Ground is unknown. Records were not complete. The Sussex Register, a local newspaper, estimated that it was "no less than 5,000" by 1876. According to historian Kevin Wright, "George Watson Roy inventoried the tombstones in the old cemetery. He claimed that there were 3,023 graves visible with 2,667 tombstones. Between October 1890 and January 1911, however, he actually recorded inscriptions from 857 grave markers representing the burials of 933 individuals." The Sussex County Historical Society's transcription of burials lists 1,287 individual known graves.

On 24 September 1992, the Old Newton Burial Ground was included on the New Jersey Register of Historic Places as part of the Newton Town Plot Historic District which was approved and entered on the National Register of Historic Places on 12 November 1992. The historic district includes 56 contributing structures and properties over 17.20 acres located on Jonathan Hampton's surveyed town plot.

The property is overseen by the Newton Cemetery Company and maintained in cooperation with the Sussex County Historical Society and Sussex County Sheriff's Office—a partnership that was organized through the efforts of historian Robert R. Longcore (1931-2013). The burial ground is adjacent to the Negro Burial Ground,  a  property bequeathed by Thomas Ryerson.

Notable burials
Notable burials amongst those interred at the Old Newton Burial Ground include:
 Colonel Thomas Anderson (1742–1805), lawyer, judge, who served in the American Revolution as quartermaster for the Continental Army and later as Sussex County Surrogate.
 William T. Anderson (1777–1850), attorney, New Jersey state senator (Legislative Council), 1821.
 The Rev. Walter Chamberlin (1822–1909), Methodist clergyman, served churches in Pennsylvania, New York and New Jersey, including nearby churches at Stillwater, Blairstown, and Stanhope.
 The Rev. James Cooke Edwards (1807–1880), Presbyterian minister in New York City, Smithtown, New York, and Morristown, New Jersey.
 Colonel Grant Fitch (1782–1848), founder, publisher of The New Jersey Herald (1829)
 David Ryerson (1782–1848), New Jersey state senator (Legislative Council), 1829–31, 1835.
 Henry Ogden Ryerson (1826–1864), Colonel in the American Civil War, prisoner of war in Richmond and Libby Prison, killed at Battle of Spotsylvania, son of Thomas C. Ryerson.
 Thomas Coxe Ryerson (1788–1838), attorney, New Jersey Supreme Court justice (1834–38), New Jersey state senator (Legislative Council), 1825–26, 1828.
 The Rev. Dr. Joseph Linn Shafer (1787–1853), pastor of the First Presbyterian Church of Newton, 1812–35 and 1838–53.
 The Rev. Garrett Van Horn (1816–1882), minister at Newton Methodist Church, and later at Middletown, Orange County, New York.

Gallery

References

Notes

Citations

External links
 
 Old Newton Burial Ground at Sussex County Historical Society website
 Old Newton Burial Ground at findagrave.com

Cemeteries in Sussex County, New Jersey
Newton, New Jersey
1762 establishments in New Jersey
History of Sussex County, New Jersey
National Register of Historic Places in Sussex County, New Jersey